Iowa Highway 1 (Iowa 1) is a state highway in the U.S. state of Iowa that extends from Keosauqua to Anamosa. Iowa 1 provides an important link to Iowa City and the University of Iowa as it passes through campus. Portions of the route today date back to the late 1830s, when Martin Van Buren was president, making Iowa 1 one of the oldest routes in the state, pre-dating the current primary highway system by nearly eighty years. The highway was seriously damaged by the Cedar River in the Iowa flood of 2008, which closed the highway for seven weeks.

Route description

Iowa 1 begins at a T-intersection with Iowa 2 in rural Van Buren County, south of Keosauqua. It passes through gently rolling farmland for  before entering the Des Moines River valley adjacent to Lacey-Keosauqua State Park. The highway crosses the Des Moines River and enters Keosauqua along Main Street. At Broad Street, Iowa 1 turned north and headed out of town. Between Keosauqua and the southern junction with Iowa 16, the highway runs parallel to the Des Moines River, the river's course bending sharply around Keosauqua. The next  run due north passing through Birmingham, before the highway crosses Cedar Creek south of Fairfield.

On the south side of Fairfield, the highway meets the new U.S. Highway 34 (US 34) / Iowa 163 bypass at a partial cloverleaf interchange. Iowa 1 enters Fairfield along Main Street.  For one block, Iowa 1 overlaps US 34 Business on Burlington Street before turning onto Second Street. Along Second Street, the highway passes under a BNSF Railway / Amtrak viaduct. North of the viaduct, Iowa 1 turns west for two blocks along Merrill Avenue and turns north again onto Fourth Street. On the northern edge of Fairfield, the highway passes next to Maharishi International University.

North of Fairfield, Iowa 1 passes the Fairfield Municipal Airport and Maharishi Vedic City. For the next , the highway continues due north through Jefferson and Keokuk County. Southeast of Richland, Iowa 1 meets Iowa 78 at a T-intersection. Heading east from this intersection, Iowa 1 and Iowa 78 overlap for  until entering Brighton on Fountain Street. Iowa 1 splits off to the north onto Benton Street while Iowa 78 turns to the south and east. North of Brighton, it crosses the Skunk River and passes through the river's  valley. For , Iowa 1 passes through southern Washington County heading northeast towards Washington.

At Washington, Iowa 1 intersects Iowa 92 on the southwestern edge of town.  The two highways curve around to the north and split  later.  Iowa 1 passes through flat farmland before crossing the English River south of Kalona. Iowa 1 skirts the western edge of Kalona and intersects Iowa Highway 22. It continues north for  before turning northeast for  more towards Iowa City.

Iowa 1 intersects US 218 and Iowa 27, the Avenue of the Saints, at a diamond interchange on the southwestern edge of Iowa City. It curves to the north of Iowa City Municipal Airport, intersecting US 6 at Riverside Drive. For , Iowa 1 overlaps US 6 on Riverside Drive before crossing the Iowa River in downtown Iowa City. On Burlington Street, Iowa 1 passes the University of Iowa library, the old state capitol, and the Ped Mall. Iowa 1 turns north onto the one-way Governor Street; Dodge Street handles the accompanying southbound lanes of traffic. The one-way streets rejoin as Dodge Street before intersecting Interstate 80 (I-80) at another diamond interchange.

At Solon, it intersects County Road F16, which provides access to Lake MacBride State Park.  southwest of Mount Vernon, Iowa 1 turns to the northeast, entering Linn County and crossing the Cedar River before entering Mount Vernon, where it intersects US 30. At First Street, Iowa 1 crosses the Lincoln Highway. On the northern edge of Mount Vernon, Iowa 1 crosses a major Union Pacific Railroad line. Iowa 1 continues north towards Martelle, where it enters Jones County.  northeast of Martelle, Iowa 1 ends at a partial cloverleaf interchange with US 151.

History 

The current Iowa 1 was designated in the 1926 Iowa highway renumbering, extending from Iowa 3 near Keosauqua to US 32 in Iowa City as a renumbering of a portion of Primary Road No. 11.  Iowa 3 was renumbered Iowa 2 in 1941 to match Nebraska's highway. In 1930, it extended east to Iowa 38 in Rochester; it replaced Iowa 139. In 1962, Iowa 1 was realigned north of Iowa City replacing Iowa 261 from  Anamosa to Iowa City.  This section approximately follows part of the route of the territorial and military road from Dubuque to Iowa City.  This road, authorized by President Martin Van Buren in 1839, was known as Dillon's Furrow, named after Dubuque merchant Lyman Dillon who surveyed the route and marked it with a furrow.  Most of the deviations of the route of Iowa 1 from Dillon's original route are the result of road straightening or bypasses around town centers. The leftover section of Iowa 1 from Iowa City to Iowa 38, part of the Herbert Hoover Highway, became the unsigned Iowa 979.

In 1997, it was announced that parts of US 151 and Iowa 1 would become the first Super two highways in Iowa.  A  section between Washington and US 30 was to be improved in 2002, but because of funding shortages, the project was scratched.

In the Iowa flood of 2008, flood waters of the Cedar River caused the closure of Iowa 1 between Solon and Mount Vernon on June 12, 2008.  Once the floods receded, major damage was left behind.  Repair work began on July 11 and was completed by July 30, 2008.

Major intersections

References

External links 

The Iowa Highways Page by Jason Hancock

001
Transportation in Van Buren County, Iowa
Transportation in Jefferson County, Iowa
Keokuk County, Iowa
Transportation in Washington County, Iowa
Transportation in Johnson County, Iowa
Transportation in Linn County, Iowa
Transportation in Jones County, Iowa
Iowa City, Iowa